Jerry Edwin Smith (born November 7, 1946) is an American attorney and jurist serving as a United States circuit judge of the United States Court of Appeals for the Fifth Circuit.

Early life and education

Born on November 7, 1946, in Del Rio, Texas, Smith received a Bachelor of Arts degree from Yale University in 1969. He received a Juris Doctor from Yale Law School in 1972.

Career 
He was a law clerk for Judge Halbert O. Woodward of the United States District Court for the Northern District of Texas from 1972 to 1973. He was in private practice of law in Houston, Texas from 1973 to 1984. He was Director of the Harris County Housing Authority from 1978 to 1980. He was a special assistant attorney general of Texas from 1981 to 1982. He was Chairman of the Houston Civil Service Commission from 1982 to 1984. He was a city attorney in Houston from 1984 to 1987.

Federal judicial service

Smith was nominated by President Ronald Reagan on June 2, 1987, to the United States Court of Appeals for the Fifth Circuit, to a new seat created by 98 Stat. 333. He was confirmed by the United States Senate on December 19, 1987, and received commission on December 21, 1987.

Notable cases

Affirmative action 
Smith wrote the majority opinion in Hopwood v. Texas, 78 F.3d 932 (5th Cir. 1996), in which the Fifth Circuit struck down the use of affirmative action in admissions at the University of Texas School of Law. Seven years later, the decision was abrogated by the U.S. Supreme Court's 5–4 decision in Grutter v. Bollinger, 539 U.S. 306 (2003).

EPA regulation 
In Corrosion Proof Fittings v. EPA, 947 F.2d 1201 (5th Cir. 1991), Smith wrote the panel opinion that required the United States Environmental Protection Agency to use cost-benefit analysis when deciding whether to ban a toxic substance.

4th amendment 
Smith dissented in a 2004 case called United States v. Gould. A large majority of the judges ruled that a "protective sweep" of a man hiding in the woods, which included arresting him without a warrant and seizing his guns, was not a violation of the 4th amendment. Although Smith's position lost that day, 17 years later the Supreme Court would unanimously take a position similar to Smith's in Caniglia v. Strom.

Securities fraud claims 
In Regents of the University of California v. Credit Suisse First Boston, 482 F.3d 372 (5th Cir. 2007), Smith wrote the majority opinion barring securities fraud claims against third parties who aided in securities fraud but did not directly mislead investors. The decision was upheld by the Supreme Court in Stoneridge Investment Partners v. Scientific-Atlanta, 552 U.S. 148 (2008).

Deep water drilling 
Smith was one of three judges on a panel that heard the appeal to Hornbeck Offshore Services LLC v. Salazar, a case challenging the U.S. Department of the Interior's six-month moratorium on exploratory drilling in deep water that was adopted in the wake of the Deepwater Horizon explosion and the subsequent oil spill. The lower court had struck down the Department of the Interior's moratorium as arbitrary and capricious government action, and the Fifth Circuit panel denied the government's emergency request to stay the lower court's decision pending appeal.

Texas House redistricting 
In November 2011, Smith, sitting on a special three-judge district court, dissented in Perez v. Perry, 835 F. Supp. 2d 209 (W.D. Tex. 2011), in which the majority adopted an interim redistricting map for the Texas House of Representatives. In his dissent, Judge Smith characterized the majority's map as being of the "purest of intentions" but "extreme" and "untethered to the applicable caselaw." Agreeing with Judge Smith, the Supreme Court unanimously vacated the district court's majority opinion in Perry v. Perez, 565 U.S. 388 (2012).

Obamacare 
In April 2012, during oral argument in a Fifth Circuit case involving the Patient Protection and Affordable Care Act (ACA), Smith ordered the Department of Justice to provide his panel of three judges with a three-page, single-spaced report explaining President Obama's views on judicial review. Judge Smith's order was prompted by Obama's recent press conference remarks on a case pending before the Supreme Court in which the Court was considering, among other things, whether to strike down the entire ACA as unconstitutional. Obama had said that if the Supreme Court overturned the ACA, it would be "an unprecedented, extraordinary step of overturning a law that was passed by a strong majority of a democratically elected Congress," and that a law that was passed by Congress on an economic issue had not been overturned by the court "going back to the ’30s, pre New Deal," remarks that were criticized by many as historically and legally inaccurate. Though Judge Smith's response and order were criticized by some legal scholars and members of the press, Bush administration U.S. Attorney General and former judge Michael Mukasey defended Smith, stating that Obama's remarks had called judicial review "into question," so that "the court has, it seems to me, every obligation to sit up and take notice of Mr. Obama." U.S. Attorney General Eric Holder said that the Justice Department would respond "appropriately" to the judge's request and filed a short response, conceding that the federal courts have the power to strike down laws passed by Congress but citing Supreme Court precedent for the proposition that those laws are presumed constitutional and should only be overturned "sparingly".

Scope of Congress's power 
In July 2012, Smith authored the bipartisan majority opinion for the en banc Fifth Circuit in United States v. Kebodeaux, 687 F.3d 232 (5th Cir. 2012), holding that, once a former federal convict has fully served his sentence and been unconditionally released from prison, the federal government cannot regulate his purely intrastate conduct merely because he was once convicted of a federal crime. Smith's majority opinion further held that the mere possibility that a person may move interstate in the future is an insufficient basis for the federal government to regulate that person under the Interstate Commerce Clause. The decision was reversed 7–2 by the Supreme Court in United States v. Kebodeaux, 133 S. Ct. 2496 (2013), on the grounds that Kebodeaux himself was not unconditionally released from federal custody, because a law in effect at the time of his offense required him to register as a sex offender after his release from prison. However, a concurring opinion by Chief Justice Roberts agreed with Judge Smith's en banc opinion on the core issue that "[t]he fact of a prior federal conviction, by itself, does not give Congress a freestanding, independent, and perpetual interest in protecting the public from the convict’s purely intrastate conduct."

Bankruptcy courts 
In November 2013, Smith authored the court's opinion in BP RE, L.P. v. RML Waxahachie Dodge, L.L.C. (In re BP RE, L.P.), 735 F.3d 279 (5th Cir. 2013), holding that a bankruptcy court lacked power under Article III of the Constitution to adjudicate "non-core" bankruptcy claims even where the parties to the proceeding consented to the bankruptcy court's authority to adjudicate the claims. Judge Smith's opinion was later abrogated in a 6–3 opinion by the Supreme Court in Wellness International Network, Ltd. v. Sharif, 135 S. Ct. 92 (2015).

Free speech 
In July 2014, Smith dissented in Texas Division, Sons of Confederate Veterans, Inc. v. Vandergriff, 759 F.3d 388 (5th Cir. 2014), in which the majority held that the Texas Department of Motor Vehicle's decision to deny an application for a specialty license plate featuring the Confederate battle flag violated the Free Speech Clause of the First Amendment. In his dissent, Judge Smith said that the specialty license plate constituted government speech rather than private speech and that therefore the First Amendment did not apply. The Supreme Court later agreed with Judge Smith in a 5–4 opinion in Walker v. Texas Division, Sons of Confederate Veterans, Inc., 135 S. Ct. 2239 (2015).

Religious freedom 
In June 2015, Smith authored the court's opinion in East Texas Baptist University v. Burwell, 793 F.3d 449 (5th Cir. 2015), upholding the Obama Administration's requirement that religious organizations either offer their employees health insurance that covers certain contraceptive services or submit a form or notification declaring their religious opposition to that coverage. Judge Smith's opinion rejected the argument that the Obama Administration's rule violated the Religious Freedom Restoration Act, finding that it did not substantially burden the religious exercise of religious organizations. His opinion was later vacated in a per curiam opinion by the Supreme Court in Zubik v. Burwell, 136 S. Ct. 1557 (2016), which called on the parties to reach a compromise that both accommodated religious institutions' exercise of religion while at the same time ensuring that women covered by religious institutions' health plans receive contraceptive coverage. The Trump Administration has since drafted a rule to roll back the Obama Administration's contraceptive requirement for many religious employers.

DAPA 
In November 2015, Smith wrote the majority opinion in Texas v. United States, 809 F.3d 134 (5th Cir. 2015), which held that the Obama Administration's Deferred Action for Parents of Americans and Lawful Permanent Residents program ("DAPA") violated the Administrative Procedure Act and affirmed the district court's preliminary injunction forbidding implementation of DAPA. In United States v. Texas, 136 S. Ct. 2271 (2016), the Supreme Court affirmed the judgment by an equally divided vote. In June 2017, the Trump Administration announced that it would not implement DAPA.

Establishment Clause 
In March 2017, Smith authored a unanimous opinion in American Humanist Ass'n v. McCarthy, 851 F.3d 521 (5th Cir. 2017), holding that the Birdville Independent School District's policy of inviting students to make speeches, which could include invocations, before school board meetings did not violate the Establishment Clause of the First Amendment, under the Supreme Court's legislative prayer exception.

Abortion 
In 2018, Smith wrote the majority opinion in June Medical Services v. Gee, 905 F.3d 787 (5th Cir. 2018), which held that the Louisiana Unsafe Abortion Protection Act (Act 620), which required doctors performing abortions to be admitted at nearby hospitals, was constitutional. In 2020, the decision was reversed in a 5–4 decision by the U.S. Supreme Court in June Medical Services, LLC v. Russo.

Qualified immunity 
In 2019, Smith wrote the majority opinion in Taylor v. Williams, 715 F App'x 332 (5th Cir. 2017).  Smith granted qualified immunity to correctional officers for their treatment of a prisoner subjected to six days' seclusion in cells covered in feces, with no water or toilet available, because it "wasn't clearly established" that "prisoners...housed in cells teeming with human waste [for] a time period so short violated the Constitution," holding that the illegality of such actions was not "beyond debatable."

2020 election 
On January 2, 2021, Smith, along with Patrick E. Higginbotham and Andy Oldham, affirmed the dismissal for lack of jurisdiction of a lawsuit filed by Louie Gohmert aimed at empowering Vice President Mike Pence to overturn President-Elect Joseph Biden's Electoral College win.

Vaccine mandates 

On February 9, 2022, Smith was one of two judges who declined to rule on a request to stay a preliminary injunction against Biden's COVID-19 vaccine mandate for federal employees. Judge Stephen A. Higginson dissented from that ruling, arguing that the government was entitled to an immediate stay while it appealed.

On February 17, Smith dissented when the majority, Jennifer Walker Elrod and Andy Oldham, reversed the district court's order denying a preliminary injunction to employees challenging United Airlines' vaccine mandate. Smith's dissent of nearly 60 pages accused the majority of flouting "fifty years of precedent and centuries of Anglo-American remedies law" and ignoring the text of the relevant statute "to extract its desired result.". He also criticized the majority for hiding its "made-up" legal theory in an unsigned and unpublished opinion. "If I ever wrote an opinion authorizing preliminary injunctive relief for plaintiffs without a cause of action, without a likelihood of success on the merits (for two reasons), and devoid of irreparable injury, despite the text, policy, and history of the relevant statute, despite the balance of equities and the public interest, and despite decades of contrary precedent from this circuit and the Supreme Court, all while inventing and distorting facts to suit my incoherent reasoning, 'I would hide my head in a bag,'" Judge Smith concluded, quoting the late Supreme Court Justice Antonin Scalia. Slate described Smith's dissent as a "60-page burst of fury" and "one of the angriest dissents of his career".

Clerks

Judge Smith's former clerks include:

 Dana Berliner (1991–92), litigation director at the Institute for Justice
 Hon. Jimmy Blacklock (2005–06), associate justice, Texas Supreme Court
 Ronald J. Colombo (1998–99), professor of law, Maurice A. Deane School of Law at Hofstra University
 Sean J. Cooksey (2014–15), commissioner, Federal Election Commission
 Tom Cotton (2002–03), U.S. Senator
 Joseph M. Ditkoff (1996–97), associate justice, Massachusetts Appeals Court
 Thomas Dupree (1997–98), former principal deputy assistant attorney general, Civil Division, U.S. Department of Justice
 Hon. Allison H. Eid (1991–92), judge, U.S. Court of Appeals for the Tenth Circuit, and former justice of the Colorado Supreme Court
 Scott Glabe (2012–2013), former Assistant Secretary of Homeland Security for Trade and Economic Security and Senior Official Performing the Duties of the Under Secretary of Homeland Security for Strategy, Policy, and Plans
 Stephen E. Henderson (1999–2000), Judge Haskell A. Holloman Professor of Law, University of Oklahoma College of Law
 Jim Hawkins (2006–07), Alumnae College Professor of Law, University of Houston Law Center
 Hon. James C. Ho (1999–2000), judge, U.S. Court of Appeals for the Fifth Circuit, and former solicitor general of Texas
 Thomas Johnson (2005–06), former general counsel, Federal Communications Commission
 Daryl Joseffer (1995–96), former Principal Deputy Solicitor General of the United States
 Lee Kovarsky (2004–05), Bryant Smith Chair in Law, University of Texas at Austin School of Law
 Julian Ku (1998–99), vice dean for academic affairs, Maurice A. Deane Distinguished Professor of Constitutional Law and Faculty Director of International Programs, Maurice A. Deane School of Law at Hofstra University, and cofounder of Opinio Juris
 Thom Lambert (1998–99), Wall Family Chair of Corporate Law and Governance, University of Missouri School of Law
 Mithun Mansinghani (2011–12), former Solicitor General of Oklahoma
 Hon. Richard T. Morrison (1993–94), judge, United States Tax Court
 Hon. John B. Nalbandian (1994–95), judge, U.S. Court of Appeals for the Sixth Circuit
 Keith Noreika (1997–98), former acting Comptroller of the Currency of the United States
 Aaron Nielson (2007–08), professor of law, J. Reuben Clark Law School at Brigham Young University
 Margaret Peterlin (2000–01), former Chief of Staff to the United States Secretary of State and former Deputy Under Secretary of Commerce for Intellectual Property and deputy director of the United States Patent and Trademark Office
 Prerak Shah (2010–11), former Acting U.S. Attorney for the Northern District of Texas and former chief of staff and chief counsel to U.S. Senator Ted Cruz
 Stephen S. Schwartz (2008–09), judge, United States Court of Federal Claims
 Ilya Somin (2001–02), professor of law, George Mason University School of Law, and Volokh Conspiracy contributor
 David H. Steinberg (1993–94), screenwriter
 Todd Zywicki (1993–94), George Mason University Foundation Professor of Law and executive director of the Law & Economics Center, George Mason University School of Law, and Volokh Conspiracy contributor

References

External links
 
Bloomberg BNA profile on Judge Smith

1946 births
20th-century American judges
21st-century American judges
Judges of the United States Court of Appeals for the Fifth Circuit
Living people
People from Houston
United States court of appeals judges appointed by Ronald Reagan
Yale Law School alumni
People from Del Rio, Texas